Kashkalashi (Qaşqalaşa) is a rural locality (a village) and the administrative centre of Kashkalashinsky Selsoviet, Blagovarsky District, Bashkortostan, Russia. The population was 611 as of 2010. There are 6 streets.

Geography 
Kashkalashi is located 19 km west of Yazykovo (the district's administrative centre) by road. Leonidovka is the nearest rural locality.

References 

Rural localities in Blagovarsky District